Adrián Martín Lucas (born 9 July 1992 in Valencia) is a Spanish Grand Prix motorcycle racer. He has previously competed in the Spanish 125GP championship and the Spanish Moto3 Championship.

Career statistics

CEV Buckler Moto3 Championship

Grand Prix motorcycle racing

By season

By class

Races by year
(key) (Races in bold indicate pole position)

References

External links

1992 births
Living people
Spanish motorcycle racers
125cc World Championship riders
Moto3 World Championship riders